Ofahoma is an unincorporated community in Leake County, Mississippi, United States.

History
Ofahoma is a name derived from the Choctaw language meaning "Red Dog"; this name most likely was applied to a local Choctaw warrior.

The community is located on the Yockanookany River and in 1900 had a population of 106.

A post office operated under the name Ofahoma from 1866 to 1982.

References

Unincorporated communities in Leake County, Mississippi
Unincorporated communities in Mississippi
Mississippi placenames of Native American origin